A Woman's Business is a 1920 American silent drama film directed by B.A. Rolfe and starring Olive Tell, Edmund Lowe and Donald Hall.

Cast
 Olive Tell as Barbara
 Edmund Lowe as Johnny Lister
 Donald Hall as Ellis
 Lucille Lee Stewart as Mrs. Ellis
 Warner Richmond as Brookes
 Annette Bade as Mrs. Brookes
 Stanley Walpole as David

References

Bibliography
 Goble, Alan. The Complete Index to Literary Sources in Film. Walter de Gruyter, 1999.

External links
 

1920 films
1920 drama films
1920s English-language films
American silent feature films
American mystery films
American black-and-white films
Films directed by B. A. Rolfe
Films produced by B. A. Rolfe
Silent mystery films
1920s American films